—

El Dorado is a 1988 Spanish film written and directed by Carlos Saura. It was entered into the 1988 Cannes Film Festival.

Synopsis
The film is about an expedition down the Amazon and Orinoco  rivers in 1560 by Spanish soldiers searching for the fabled city of gold, El Dorado. Taking some followers and family along on the journey, they descend into madness and battle the environment and each other.

Cast
 Omero Antonutti as Lope de Aguirre
 Lambert Wilson as Pedro de Ursúa
 Eusebio Poncela as Guzmán
 Gabriela Roel as Inés
 Inés Sastre as Elvira
 José Sancho as La Bandera
 Patxi Bisquert as Pedrarías
 Francisco Algora as LLamoso
 Féodor Atkine as Montoya
 Abel Vitón as Henao
 Francisco Merino as Alonso Esteban
 Mariano González as Zalduendo
 Gladys Catania as Juana
 Alfredo Catania as Vargas
 Gustavo Rojas as Carrión

References

External links
 
 

1988 films
1988 drama films
1980s Spanish-language films
Films about conquistadors
Drama films based on actual events
Films directed by Carlos Saura
Films set in the Spanish Empire
Films set in South America
Films set in the 1560s
Indigenous cinema in Latin America
Spanish drama films
1980s Spanish films
Cultural depictions of Spanish men